Jamie Weinstein is an American political journalist, opinion commentator, and satirist. He is the host of The Jamie Weinstein Show podcast formerly at National Review Online.

Early life and education
Weinstein was born in Allentown, Pennsylvania. He grew up in Palm Beach Gardens, Florida. He attended Cornell University, where he graduated in 2006 with a BA in history and government. He later attended the London School of Economics, where he received a MS in the history of international relations.

Career
Weinstein's work has appeared in The Weekly Standard, The Daily Beast, and The Washington Examiner, among other publications. Weinstein has appeared regularly on MSNBC, Fox News, Hannity, HBO's Real Time with Bill Maher, Morning Joe, Your World with Neil Cavuto, America's Newsroom, Fox and Friends, and Red Eye w/Greg Gutfeld'".

In 2011, Weinstein was named the funniest celebrity in Washington, D.C. by revamp.com. 

In 2012, Weinstein co-wrote (with Will Rahn) a book called The Lizard King: The Shocking Inside Account of Obama's True Intergalactic Ambitions by an Anonymous White House Staffer, which was published by HarperCollins.

In early 2016, Weinstein gave a speech in favor of Virginia governor Jim Gilmore's presidential candidacy at an Iowa caucus for a story. He was not a supporter of Gilmore's candidacy.

Personal life
In May 2016, Weinstein became engaged to former Huffington Post'' political journalist Michelle Fields. The two were married on June 24, 2017.

References

External links
Official website
Podcast episodes 

Cornell University alumni
Alumni of the London School of Economics
Living people
Year of birth missing (living people)
American political journalists
American opinion journalists
American columnists
American satirists
Jewish American journalists
21st-century American Jews